Nasty Girl may refer to:
The Nasty Girl, a 1990 film directed by Michael Verhoeven
 "Nasty Girl" (Vanity 6 song), 1982 written by Prince, later re-released by Inaya Day
 "Nasty Girl" (Destiny's Child song), 2002
 "Nasty Girl" (Nitty song), March 2005
 "Nasty Girl" (The Notorious B.I.G. song), October 2005
 "Nasty Girl" (Sterling Simms song), 2007
 "Nasty Girl" (Ludacris song), 2009
 "U a Freak (Nasty Girl)", 2006 Chingy song
 "Nasty Girl/On Camera", by Gunna from the 2020 album Wunna
 A nickname for Humayun Rashid

See also 
 Nasty Gal, U.S. online retailer
 Nasty Baby, 2015 Chilean-American film
 Nasty Boys (disambiguation)
 Naughty Girl (disambiguation)